The dēmarchos (plural δήμαρχοι, dēmarchoi), anglicized as Demarch, is a title historically given to officials related to civic administration. In ancient Athens the title was given to the elected chief magistrate of each of the demes of Attica. In the Byzantine Empire the dēmarchos was the leader of one of the racing factions (then known as "demes") of the Hippodrome of Constantinople. Largely concerned with ceremonial in the early centuries, from the 11th century the title was applied to various administrative positions in Constantinople, until the end of the empire. In modern usage, the term is used for the mayor of a municipality.

Ancient Greece

Athens
The office lasted for one year, and was elected from the members of the deme (the δημώται), initially by direct vote, but by the end of the 4th century, he was usually elected by lot. In some demes, the office was eponymous, i.e. it was used for dating, along with the names of the eponymous archons of the entire  of Athens.

Along with the treasurers he supervised the deme's landed properties and their rent, as well as expenditure; along with the priests he was responsible for religious festivals, sacrifices, or theatre performances. As chief magistrate he also possessed considerable judicial powers, including holding his outgoing predecessor to account, and chairing the assembly when it was functioning as a public court.

Occupying a crucial position at the interface between the deme and the Athenian , he was also charged with maintaining up to date the deme's register of citizens, which he kept sealed at his own residence, as well as registers of those citizens eligible for naval service as rowers in the triremes. It is unclear whether he was also responsible for maintaining registers of those eligible for hoplite service. He also had fiscal duties, supervising confiscations and maintaining the registers of confiscated property, as well as collecting (before 387/86 BC) the  tax from property-owning citizens.

Other usage

It is unclear whether it was held by a single person or a college of holders. The office survived into the Roman period, where it was reduced to a largely symbolic role supervising public religious acts and festivals. Its holders included the Roman emperors Titus and Hadrian. The office survived at least until the time of Constantine the Great.

The term  was thus rendered .

Byzantine usage

Background
In Late Antiquity, the term "demes" came to be used for the associations responsible for the organization of games and chariot races. There were usually four, known by their colours as the Blues (Βένετοι), Greens (Πράσινοι), Whites (Λευκοὶ), and Reds (Ῥούσιοι). The Blues and Greens were the most important, with the Whites and Reds as their respective junior partners. In Late Antiquity, they were widespread across the Byzantine Empire, and even played an important political role, both as leading ceremonial acclamations to the emperor in the Hippodrome of Constantinople, and as organizing factors in urban riots in the empire's great cities, notably the Nika revolt in Constantinople.

History and functions
The 10th-century Patria of Constantinople refer to two  under Theodosius II, but this is most likely an anachronism. In popular usage, they are sometimes called  (διοικηταὶ).

The  records their staff of subaltern officials:
 a deputy
 a secretary and a notary
 a poet and a composer for the acclamations during ceremonies
 a master and the 'first ones', whose role is obscure
 a 'neighbourhood supervisor', whose exact duties are unclear
 the ordinary members
The actual personnel of the Hippodrome were not part of their staff.

The continuity with their 9th–10th century forebears is unclear. The title survived into the Palaiologan period, charged with various administrative duties in Constantinople: according to a letter of Patriarch Athanasius I of Constantinople (1289–1293 and 1303–1309), two  were responsible for supervising the grain trade and bread production, while later in the 14th century the  administered the quarters of the city.

During the final siege of Constantinople in 1453, the  assumed the role of military commanders.

References

Sources
 
 
 
 
 
 

Administration of Constantinople
Ancient Attica
Ancient Athenian titles